Gamlakarleby Bollklubb is a Finnish football club from Kokkola (Gamlakarleby in Swedish). It currently plays in the Finnish Second Division (Kakkonen), which is the third-highest level in Finnish football. GBK play their home games at the Keskuskenttä in Kokkola, which has the capacity to accommodate around 3,000 people.

GBK is a bilingual club that organises its activities in both Finnish and Swedish.

Club history
Year 1920 IV (Idrottens vänner) and GUIK (Gamlakarleby Ungdomsförenings Idrottsklubb) joined their teams and the new club Gamlakarleby Idrottsförenig (GIF) was founded.

Year 1921 the sponsor of GIF, August Kyntzell, had visited England and seen Stoke City playing in their red and white striped dress. Kyntzell became fond of the costumes and decided that his team (GIF and later GBK) would play in the same colours. In the summer of 1921 GIF appeared in red and white striped costumes.

19 February 1924 GIF changed its name to GBK, and it is therefore one of Finland's oldest football clubs. GBK's activity is currently focused on football, but the club has also played ice hockey and bandy until the 1950s. The ice hockey club Kokkolan Hermes, (now Hermes HT) was formed in 1953, when GBK and KPV ice hockey sections amalgamated.

The club has a long tradition and has played 5 seasons in the Finnish Championship in 1959, 1964–66 and 1976.  They have also played 39 seasons at the second tier and 15 seasons in the third tier. In recent years GBK have played in the Ykkönen (First Division) and Kakkonen (Second Division). The club secured promotion to the Ykkönen in September 2006 but their return to the second tier was short-lived as they were relegated at the end of the 2007 season. Since 2008 they have been playing in the Kakkonen.

In 2000 GBK became the first women's beach soccer champion in Finland and the following year became a new championship team .

Divisional Movements since 1930

Top Level (5 seasons): 1959, 1964–66, 1976
Second Level (39 seasons): 1938–39, 1945-46/47, 1948–49, 1951–58, 1960–63, 1967–75, 1977–80, 1995–97, 2002–04, 2007
Third Level (15 seasons): 1981, 1984–85, 1990–91, 1993–94, 1998–2001, 2005–06, 2008–

Season to season

5 seasons in Veikkausliiga
39 seasons in Ykkönen
30 seasons in Kakkonen
7 seasons in Kolmonen

Kokkola Cup

The football tournament known as the Kokkola Cup is organised by GBK and is held in mid-July each year. This four-day tournament attracts about 300 teams to Kokkola and is recognised as Finland's second biggest football tournament after the Helsinki Cup.

The Kokkola Cup was initiated in 1981 by Lars-Erik Stenfors and the tournament has grown from 50 teams to 330 teams at its peak. Current professional players who have participated in the Kokkola Cup include Andy Marshall, Jimmy Nielsen, Craig Bellamy, Adam Drury, Danny Mills, Simon Davies and Matthew Etherington.

2014 season

GBK are competing in Group C (Lohko C) of the Kakkonen administered by the Football Association of Finland (Suomen Palloliitto).  In 2013 the team finished in fifth place in Group C of the Kakkonen.

GBK II are participating in the Nelonen section administered by the Keski-Pohjanmaa SPL.

GBK III are competing in Section B (Lohko B) of the Kutonen administered by the Keski-Pohjanmaa SPL.

Current squad Legende GBK Kokkola

References and sources
Official Website
Finnish Wikipedia
Suomen Cup
 GBK(Gamlakarleby Bollklubb) Facebook

Footnotes

Football clubs in Finland
Defunct bandy clubs in Finland
Kokkola
Association football clubs established in 1924
Bandy clubs established in 1924
1924 establishments in Finland